The 1904 Maryland Aggies football team represented Maryland Agricultural College (later part of the University of Maryland) in the 1904 college football season. In their third and final season under head coach D. John Markey, the Aggies compiled a 2–4–2 record and were outscored by all opponents, 62 to 33.

Schedule

References

Maryland
Maryland Terrapins football seasons
Maryland Aggies football